Cyclophora packardi, Packard's wave moth or Packard's wave, is a moth in the  family Geometridae. It is found in North America, from Maine to Florida, west to Texas and north to Iowa and Ohio.

The wingspan is 17–23 mm. The wings are yellowish to orangish-brown. Adults are on wing from April/May to September.

The larvae possibly feed on Comptonia and/or Quercus species.

References

Moths described in 1936
packardi
Moths of North America